A Very Good Professional Wrestler (born 1983 or 1982), formerly known by his ring name Dasher Hatfield, is an American professional wrestler. He is best known for his work in Chikara and its sister promotion Wrestling is Fun!.

Professional wrestling career

Chikara
Hatfield debuted for Chikara at King of Trios 2007 in Barnesville, Pennsylvania under the ring name Create A Wrestler in which he lost to Chuck Taylor. The premise of the Create-A-Wrestler gimmick was that he did not have a defined character and the fans would get to suggest ideas for gimmicks for him.  Because his identity was entirely up to the fans, he was billed from "Wherever You Want!" After having brief runs as MosCow the Communist Bovine and Ultimo Breakfast, he was reintroduced at Chikara Young Lions Cup VII as Hatfield, a wrestling baseball player. Hatfield formed a tag team called the Throwbacks with fellow Chikara superstar Sugar Dunkerton, a wrestling basketball player, who in 2011 failed to capture the Chikara Campeonatos de Parejas. Hatfield then joined Mark Angelosetti to form the new Throwbacks and successfully captured the Campeonatos De Parejas belts from Jigsaw and The Shard in 2014 until December where they lost the belts to The Devastation Corporation at Tomorrow Never Dies.

Hatfield was named one of the ten team captains for Chikara's Challenge of the Immortals tournament. Hatfield picked Mark Angelosetti, then-Chikara Grand Champion Icarus and Chikara Young Lions Cup Champion Heidi Lovelace. This team would be named "Dasher's Dugout". On May 26, 2019 at Aniversario: Scotch Mist, he was defeated by his (kayfabe) son Boomer Hatfield in a mask vs. mask match. Hatfield left Chikara soon after the promotion shut down on June 24, 2020, resulting in him being the final Grand Champion. He later announced on July 18, that he was changing his ring name to A Very Good Professional Wrestler.

Championships and accomplishments

Camp Leapfrog
Camp Leapfrog Championship (1 time, current)
Chikara
Chikara Campeonatos de Parejas (1 time) — with Mark Angelosetti
Chikara Grand Championship (1 time)
Interim Chikara Grand Championship (1 time)
Tag World Grand Prix (2018)
Torneo Cibernetico (2016)
East Coast Wrestling Association
ECWA Super 8 Tournament (2020)
Pro Wrestling Illustrated
Ranked No. 311 of the top 500 singles wrestlers in the PWI 500 in 2021
Wrestling is Fun!
Tag World Grand Prix (2014) — with Mark Angelosetti

Luchas de Apuestas record

References

External links

Living people
Year of birth missing (living people)
Place of birth missing (living people)
Fictional baseball players
Masked wrestlers
Fictional cattle